Aurora HDR is photographic software developed by Skylum Software (formerly Macphun) for Mac OS X and Windows. It attempted to create a powerful, simple yet fast HDR photo editing software.

Aurora HDR is a High Dynamic Range (HDR) editing and processing tool released in November 2015. It was made through a collaboration between Skylum and HDR photographer Trey Ratcliff.  HDR image editing techniques are designed to overcome difficult lighting situations where highlights and shadows are prevalent in the same image, but have also been used to create highly processed images as well.

By automatically aligning and merging multiple exposures of photos, Aurora HDR can create a single tone-mapped image. A collection of editing and processing tools also allow for layered compositions and targeted areas of photo and graphic processing.

Versions and plug-ins 
Aurora HDR comes in five different versions for two different operating systems. Versions, previous and current, include: Aurora HDR (optionally sold on the Mac App Store); Aurora HDR Pro; Aurora HDR Pro + training, Aurora 2017; and Aurora 2018. The software runs as a standalone or as a plug-in to host applications like Adobe Photoshop, Adobe Photoshop Lightroom, Adobe Photoshop Elements, and Apple Aperture. In early 2016, Aurora HDR was updated with support to run as an editing extension for Apple Photos for Mac. In 2016 Skylum released the next version of Aurora HDR - Aurora HDR 2017 along with a Windows version.  In 2018 Skylum released Aurora 2018 for Mac and Windows operating systems.

Key Aurora HDR functionality

Initial merging 
Aurora HDR works on single images or multiple exposures, and initial merging options change depending on the number of images loaded. If a single image is provided to the software, only the "Chromatic Aberration Reduction" option is available. If multiple exposures are selected, "Alignment" and "Ghost Reduction" options are revealed. Alignment should be checked if the multiple images were recorded while holding the camera by hand vs. a tripod. Ghost Reduction relates to minimizing the effects of moving objects in a multi-exposure merging process. If you have moving objects, choose this function.

Interface 
The user interface of Aurora HDR consists of the following:
 Large preview window
 Open & Export/Share
 Zoom & navigation controls
 Comparison controls
 Undo/Redo
 Cropping tool
 Move (hand) tool
 Brush
 Layers
 Histogram
 Presets
 Advanced tools

Presets 
Presets are pre-installed one-click controls that apply a specific "style" to the tone-mapped image. This style is created entirely by the use and modification of the Advance tools containing in the software. The Preset panel in Aurora HDR Pro contains 7 separate categories applicable to all types of photos: Trey Ratcliff's Signature presets, Basic, Realistic HDR, Dramatic, Landscape, Indoor, Architecture, each of which contain thumbnail graphics representing several or dozens of styles. In addition, users may designate a preset as a "favorite" or create their own.

Tools 
Aurora HDR comes with an extensive list of tools and functionality designed to help photographers edit their images using HDR techniques. The tools range from those that can help reproduce a natural, realistic look to those that enhance images towards a more fantasy-like direction. Each tool listed below has a unique set of controls to modify its effects.
 Tone Mapping
 Tone
 Structure
 HDR Denoise
 Image Radiance
 Color
 Details
 Glow
 Top & Bottom Lighting
 Tone Curve
 Color Filter
 Color Toning
 Vignette

Layers, brushes and masking 
Aurora HDR Pro features the ability to create up to 9 layers (4 in the Mac App Store version), and provides brushing and masking functionality common in many image-editing software programs. Layers can be automatically loaded with either (a) the previous layer, (b) a custom texture, (c) the original tone-mapped image, or (d) any one of the exposures in the bracketed set. Brushes and masking, including Gradient Masking are used to selectively apply or erase effects from the image. An advanced feature of the Pro version of Aurora HDR is to designate a layer as one that contains "Luminosity Masking."

Opening, file formats and exporting 
Aurora HDR opens a variety of popular image file formats, including RAW camera files that are the native to specific camera manufacturers (e.g. Nikon's NEF and Canon CR2). It saves in a native file format (.mpau) which allows for the resumption of editing after saving and closing the file. The software exports in the following file formats: JPG, PNG, GIF, JPG-2000, TIFF, Photoshop, and PDF, and can also transfer images directly into Skylum's Creative Suite for further editing.

Sharing 
The software permits sharing to image galleries like 500px, Smugmug and Flickr, plus social networks like Facebook and Twitter. Additionally Aurora HDR can send images via email or Apple Messages.

References

External links
 Official Website

Photo software
Raster graphics editors
HDR tone mapping software